Michael Darren Cassidy (born 3 July 1973) is the Head of youth development of the Wigan Warriors and a former professional rugby league footballer. Cassidy had a wealth of experience with the dominant Wigan side of the early to mid-1990s. Cassidy is a Great Britain representative. Cassidy has been labelled a utility player and has played wherever he has been needed.

Background
Cassidy was born in Wigan, Lancashire, England.

Playing career

Wigan
Cassidy was born in Wigan, Lancashire, and started his career out at his hometown club, Wigan, and progressed through the academy ranks to make his senior début at the age of 18.

Cassidy was an interchange/substitute, i.e. number 15, in Wigan's 2–33 defeat by Castleford in the 1993–94 Regal Trophy Final during the 1993–94 season at Elland Road, Leeds on Saturday 22 January 1994, played right- in the 40–10 victory over Warrington in the 1994–95 Regal Trophy Final during the 1994–95 season at Alfred McAlpine Stadium, Huddersfield on Saturday 28 January 1995, and played right- in the 25–16 victory over St. Helens in the 1995–96 Regal Trophy Final during the 1994–95 season at Alfred McAlpine Stadium, Huddersfield on Saturday 13 January 1996.

After the 1993–94 Rugby Football League season Cassidy travelled with defending champions Wigan to Brisbane, playing from the interchange bench in their 1994 World Club Challenge victory over Australian premiers, Brisbane Broncos. Cassidy was part of the England squad at the 1995 Rugby League World Cup. He was selected to play for England in the 1995 World Cup Final on the reserve bench but Australia won the match and retained the Cup.

He played for Wigan from the interchange bench in their 1998 Super League Grand Final victory over Leeds.
Cassidy later switched allegiance through ancestry to play for Ireland. He was ruled out of the 2000 Rugby League World Cup through injury. Cassidy served a total of 14 years at the Wigan club, enjoying a testimonial in 2000.
Cassidy was named in the Wigan team of the decade and was acknowledged as one of the game's best utility players.

Widnes
Cassidy joined Widnes in 2005, earning the 'Player of the Year' award in his first season at the Halton Stadium. He could not, however save them from relegation from Super League in 2005's Super League X. Cassidy represented the Irish side on numerous occasions over several years. He was named in the Ireland squad for the 2008 Rugby League World Cup. Cassidy finished his playing career with Cumbrian side Barrow Raiders, helping the club win promotion from National League Two in 2008.

References

External links
Mick Cassidy Statistics at wigan.rlfans.com
 ĎŔƑ "My life in rugby league: Mick Cassidy" interview at TotalRL.com
(archived by web.archive.org) Barrow Raiders profile
Ireland profile
Widnes profile
Clark impressed by Cassidy début

1973 births
Living people
Barrow Raiders players
England national rugby league team players
English people of Irish descent
English rugby league players
Great Britain national rugby league team players
Ireland national rugby league team players
Rugby league hookers
Rugby league players from Wigan
Rugby league props
Rugby league second-rows
Rugby league utility players
Widnes Vikings players
Wigan Warriors players